Music festivals have a long and chequered history in New Zealand. The first large outdoor rock music festivals were Redwood 70 in 1970 and the Great Ngaruawahia Music Festival in 1973. The largest was the 1979 Nambassa festival, one of several Nambassa festivals held around that time, in Golden Valley, just north of Waihi.

"There are regular jazz, folk, ethnic and country music awards and festivals, some of which have been in existence for decades. Large music festivals, for example Sweetwaters Music Festivals, Nambassa and The Big Day Out have been staged periodically since the 1970s", says Te Ara: The Encyclopedia of New Zealand.

Parachute Music Festival is a Christian music festival held in New Zealand. It was one of New Zealands largest music festivals and it is the Southern Hemispheres largest Christian music festival. 
On March 27, 2014 Parachute Music released a statement on its Facebook and its website announcing that Parachute Music Festival would no longer be running.

Largest 
Nambassa 1979 was the largest music event in New Zealand. "Nearly 60,000 came, making it, per capita, the world’s largest festival of its type." "Nambassa will be remembered for many things. It was the largest campsite, the biggest and brightest party, and the best attended and most successful musical and cultural event ever in New Zealand."

 Hamsterfest Folk Festival – 1970–present

Current recurring events 
 ANZEM Festival – 2020–Present – Auckland
 Auckland Folk Festival – 1973–present
 Aum New Years Eve Festival ॐ – Auckland
 Bay of Islands Jazz and Blues Festival – 1999 or earlier to present.
 Canterbury Folk Festival – ?–present. Currently near Waipara, North Canterbury, over Easter
 Cardrona Folk Festival – 1977–present – small folk festival in the Cardrona Valley between Wanaka and Arrowtown over Labour Weekend
 Coro Summer Fest – 2105–present – small festival in Coromandel Town, held on the second or third weekend of January 
 CubaDupa - 2015-present - Huge free street arts festival in Cuba Street, Wellington. 500 events in two days, last weekend of March each year
 Earth Beat Music + Arts Festival — 2015–present, Auckland, New Zealand
 Electric Avenue Festival – 2015–present – Hagley Park, Christchurch
 Festival One – 2005–present – Christian Music Festival
 A Low Hum – 2006–2014 – Small music festival in Wellington each year over Waitangi Weekend. 50 bands over 3 or 4 days.
 Highlife NYE Experience – Auckland
 Homegrown – Wellington
 Tora Bombora – Tora, South Wairarapa. 2019–present
 Luminate Festival – Pikikirunga, Golden Bay, Nelson
 New Zealand International Jazz & Blues Festival – 1999–present, Christchurch, New Zealand
 Northern Bass – Mangawhai.
 Outfield Music, Food & Festival — 2019–present, Hawke's Bay, New Zealand
 Queenstown Winter Festival – Queenstown
 Rhythm & Alps – unknown-present – in Cardrona Valley near Wanaka.
 Rhythm & Vines – 2003–present – vineyard near Gisborne.
 Soundscape (New Zealand festival) – 2010–present – Hamilton CBD.
 SoundSplash – Whaingaroa / Raglan and Timaru, New Zealand reggae festival.
 Splore – Tapapakanga Regional Park. Ten years festival.
 St Jerome's Laneway Festival – 2010–present – Auckland
 Swampfest – 2004–present – Palmerston North's Globe Theatre.
 Tui Folk Festival – Near Tapawera in the Nelson district over New Year.
 Waimate Folk Festival – formerly the Whitestone Folk Festival – small festival at Gunns Bush near Waimate in South Canterbury over Queen's Birthday Weekend
 Wellington Folk Festival (Wellyfest) – over Labour Weekend
 Whare Flat Folk Festival – 1975–present, near Whare Flat in the Silverstream Valley, a short distance from Dunedin, over New Year.

Past recurring events 
 Alpine Unity – 2001–2002, Southern Alps. Later rebranded as Alpine.
 Big Day Out – 1994–1997, 1999–2012, 2014 – Mt Smart Stadium, Auckland.
 Big Gay Out – Pt Chevalier, Auckland.
 Brown Trout Festival – 1980, 1983 – on a farm east of Dannevirke
 BW Summer Festival – 2004–2015– Lead-up to Rhythm & Vines in Gisborne.
 Coromandel Gold – Whitianga.
 Destination – 2001–2004, Cave Stream, Southern Alps.
 The Gathering – 1996–2002 – Canaan Downs, Takaka Hill, near Nelson (96/97, 97/98, 98/99, G2000) and Cobb Valley, Golden Bay, near Nelson (G1 and G2).
 G-TARanaki Guitar Festival – 2008–2010 – International guitar festival in New Plymouth, Taranaki.
 La De Da – 2010–2013 -held at Daisybank Farm, in Martinborough.
 Mountain Rock Music Festival – 1992–1996 – Farm near Pahiatua.
 Nambassa – 1978, 1979, 1981 – Music and alternatives festivals in Golden Valley, north of Waihi and Waitawheta valley near Waikino.
 Parachute Music Festival – 1995–2014 – contemporary Christian music attracting around 30,000 people each year to Mystery Creek, Waikato.
 Parihaka International Peace Festival – Parihaka – Taranaki. 2006–2010. The farmland close to the three marae at Parihaka was turned into a festival site with camping for four days.
 Phat – Maitai Valley, near Nelson, and Inangahua. The 2007 event was called 'Phat07 Bass Camp'
 Redwood music festivals – unknown – Farm/orchard at Redwood Park, West Auckland.
 Resolution – New Year's Eve dance party near Whitianga, Coromandel. 
 Strawberry Fields Music Festivals – 1993–1995 – Farm near Queenstown; farm at Te Uku near Raglan.
 SummerDaze – Queenstown.
 Sweetwaters Music Festival – 1980–1984, 1999 – Farm near Ngāruawāhia; farm near Pukekawa. A Sweetwaters South festival was also staged in Christchurch in 1985.
 Te Wairua – January 1986–89 and Gathering 1989 and Gathering 1990 (not connected to the Canaan Downs Gatherings); New Age festivals held on a farm east of Ōwhango on the bank of the Whakapapa river. No mainstage, but a marquee and permanent building as HQ. Intensive, day-long Native American style sweat lodges were a feature of these festivals. Te Wairua is Māori for "The Spirit".
 Visionz music festival, pakawau Billy King creek, Robinsons farm, Golden Bay 2000-2004

Past events 
 Concert for the Deaf – unknown – Sports (rugby) stadium in Hamilton
 Full Circle New Year 31 December 2004 – 2 January 2005. Cobb Valley, Golden Bay.
 The Great Ngaruawahia Music Festival – 6–8 January 1973 – Farm at Ngāruawāhia, 19 kilometres north-west of Hamilton, on the Waikato River.
 Hinuera Music Festival – Farm at Hinuera, near Matamata.
 The Moos – 2001 – Check-Point Charlie – Farm (sheep station) near Rimutaka Forest park.
 Redwood 70 – 31 January–1 February 1970 – Redwood Park, Swanson, West Auckland
 Toots & Grooves – 25–27 January 2008 – Wellington's Ska festival over 2 days.
 Waikino music festival – January 1977 – Farm at Waitawheta near Waikino, between Waihi and Karangahake Gorge. Pre-event run by Nambassa.
 Zombies' Jamboree – c1987 acoustic music festival at Muhunoa, east of Ohau, Horowhenua

Memorable events 
 The Great Ngaruawahia Music Festival – Corben Simpson removed all his clothes on stage and was reported nationwide in the media, Black Sabbath burned a cross on the hill while getting the entire audience to light a match or lighter. "Todd (Hunter) ... gathered some friends and fellow performers for an appearance at the Great Ngaruawahia Music Festival. They wrote original songs for their set list, and someone pulled the name "Dragon" out of an I Ching book. Their performance at the Ngaruawahia Music Festival led to a better gig, a few weeks performing at the Occidental Hotel in Auckland."
 Sweetwaters Music Festival – On closing night with jam packed traffic, A man had a serious seizure, a doctor was called via helicopter, the police boat transferred the man across the Waipa river to a waiting ambulance, bound for Waikato hospital. On opening night a girl broke both ankles while riding the bonnet of a car into the farm.
 Hinuera – Mother Goose.
 Hinuera – Ragnarok The main stage stopped due to rain, a rapid system was put together in the Barn for Ragnarok, using Greg Peacocks Cerwin-Vega composite bins, previously used as cross stage side fill monitors, on the main stage.
 Rhythm & Vines – In 2014, a large riot broke out on New Year's Eve at Gisborne's BW campground. The campground traditionally played host to a majority of the Rhythm & Vines festival attendees. In the years leading up to 2014, a culture of excessive drinking and raucous behaviour, particularly on the final day of the festival, had been established at the campground. The campground's liberal B.Y.O. policy enabled festival attendees to load up on alcohol throughout New Year's Eve, prior to boarding buses to the nearby R&V festival where B.Y.O. was not permitted. Unlike previous years, the 2014 BW campground did not allow campers to enter sections of the campground aside from that in which they were tenting. This enforced segregation of campers was disliked by many attendees, and early in the afternoon, as excitement began to build for the night ahead, a coordinated effort was made by a minority of campers to attempt to tear down the deer fencing which divided the campground. Security was quickly overwhelmed, and the successful flattening of the first fence sparked general dissent and disorderly behaviour throughout the entire campground. Over the next few hours chaos ensued, as tents and gazebos were systematically flattened and set on fire by punters. Several large bonfires were fuelled by tents and camping equipment. The event resulted in 63 arrests, 83 reported injuries, and seven hospital admissions. As attendees began boarding the buses to the nearby site of the RnV festival, the violence died away leaving a ruined campground. Tighter security at the site of the R&V festival meant that the overflow of disorder between BW campground and the main event was minimal. 2014 was the final year that BW hosted Rhythm and Vines attendees en masse. Partly as a result of this event, summer music festivals with B.Y.O. alcohol licenses have become almost unheard of in New Zealand.

Gallery

Books 
 Keighley, Daniel. Sweetwaters: The Untold Story. Reviewed by Simon Sweetman: "Daniel Keighley was the man behind the financial disaster that was Sweetwaters ’99. He was charged with fraud and jailed and Sweetwaters: The Untold Story is his account of what went wrong. Billed as an autobiography."
 Nambassa: A New Direction, edited by Colin Broadley and Judith Jones, A. H. & A. W. Reed, 1979.

References

External links 
 Te Ara: The Encyclopedia of New Zealand
 Sweetwaters: The Untold Story
 Oceania Audio
 Barton Sound
 Parihaka
 Parihaka Gallery 
 NZ Music
 Nambassa Trust
 Bruce Sergent New Zealand Music
 New Zealand In Brief / Creative Life
 Strawberry Fields relisted PDF
 The Gathering archives
 FestivalPlanet Information on NZ Music Festivals in 2010
 History of New Zealand rock music festivals (NZHistory.net.nz)
 One Love Festival
 SoundSplash Festival
 (https://www.amazon.com/gp/product/B018MERX0A Sweetwaters Music Festival 1983)

 
Lists of music festivals in Oceania